The 2006 Women's British Open was held 3–6 August at Royal Lytham & St Annes Golf Club in Lancashire, England. It was the 30th edition of the Women's British Open, and the sixth as a major championship on the LPGA Tour.

Sherri Steinhauer, 43, won her second major title, three strokes ahead of runners-up Sophie Gustafson and Cristie Kerr. It was Steinhauer's third win at the Women's British Open, but the first since it was designated a major in 2001. The earlier wins were consecutive, in 1998 and 1999.

This was the final Women's British Open sponsored by Weetabix, which began its 20-year relationship with the event in 1987. It was replaced by Ricoh in 2007 at St. Andrews.

Field

Past champions in the field

Made the cut

Missed the cut

Course layout

Source:

Previous length of the course for the Women's British Open (since 2001):
 2003: , par 72

Round summaries

First round
Thursday, 3 August 2006

Second round
Friday, 4 August 2006

Amateurs: Mozo (+3), Yang (+6), Simon (+8), Schaeffer (+11), MacRae (+18).

Third round
Saturday, 5 August 2006

Final round
Sunday, 6 August 2006

Amateurs: Yang (+13), Mozo (+19)

Source:

References

External links
Ladies European Tour: 2006 Weetabix Women's British Open results
LPGA: 2006  Women's British Open results

Women's British Open
Golf tournaments in England
British Open
Women's British Open
Women's British Open
2000s in Lancashire